Sexy Beasts is a British reality television dating game show produced by Lion Television and aired on BBC Three from 14 February to 9 September 2014. The show features people being transformed with prosthetic makeup into animal and mythical creatures.

Concept 
The show's format involves one eligible single (male or female) and three possible suitors, all four of which have been made over with prosthetic makeup. Each "beast" will then go on a date with the singleton.  Over the course of the show, two will be eliminated, at which point their make up is removed and their real identity is revealed for the first time. The remaining person is then chosen as the winner to go on a second date.

International versions 
The show has been adapted and broadcast in several other countries including America on A&E, Germany on Sixx and Korea on KBS. In 2021, Netflix released a revival of the show with  comedian Rob Delaney providing the voice over.

Episodes

Valentine's Specials

Series 1 (2014)

Netflix revival

Season 1 (2021)

Season 2 (2021)

Reception
Double Toasted was highly critical of the show; calling the dates shallow and finding the makeup unnecessary. They took issue with the entire premise with Chris Herman suggesting that the series should have centered around those associated with furry fandom.

References

External links

2014 British television series debuts
2014 British television series endings
2010s British reality television series
BBC reality television shows
British dating and relationship reality television series
English-language television shows
Television series by All3Media